Tim Monroe (born February 3, 2000) is an American professional stock car racing driver. He competes part-time in the ARCA Menards Series, driving the No. 10 Ford Fusion for Fast Track Racing.

Racing career

ARCA Menards Series 
Monroe made his ARCA Menards Series debut in 2020 at the Daytona International Speedway Road Course. He DNF'ed due to electrical issues, finishing 20th. He ran 2 other races at Lebanon I-44 Speedway and Illinois State Fairgrounds Racetrack, failing to finish either race. Monroe ran two races in 2021 at Illinois State Fairgrounds and DuQuoin State Fairgrounds Racetrack, finishing 8th and 6th.

Motorsports career results

ARCA Menards Series

ARCA Menards Series East

ARCA Menards Series West

References

External links 

2000 births
Living people
ARCA Menards Series drivers
NASCAR drivers
Racing drivers from Illinois
People from Elmwood, Illinois